San Polo d'Enza is a comune (municipality) in the Emilia-Romagna region of Northern Italy, located about  west of Bologna and about  southwest of Reggio Emilia.   
San Polo d'Enza borders the following municipalities: Bibbiano, Canossa, Montecchio Emilia, Montechiarugolo, Quattro Castella, Traversetolo, Vezzano sul Crostolo.

People
Giovanni Guicciardi, Italian opera singer

References

Cities and towns in Emilia-Romagna